Evie may refer to:

People and fictional characters
 Evie (given name)
 Evie (singer), American contemporary Christian music singer Evelyn Tornquist (born 1957)
 Evie (wrestler), ring name of New Zealand female professional wrestler Cheree Crowley (born 1988)

Organisations

 Project EVIE, a non-profit organization founded in the United States to promote the adoption of electric vehicles

Other uses
 Evie, Orkney, a village on the Mainland, Orkney, Scotland
 Citroën C1 ev'ie, an electric car available in the United Kingdom
 "Evie" (song), a 1974 single by Stevie Wright
 Evie, an artificial intelligence bot that uses Cleverbot's engine

See also 
 Eve (disambiguation)
 Evi (disambiguation)
 Evy (disambiguation)
 Ive (disambiguation)
 Ivy (disambiguation)
 Yve
 Ivey (disambiguation)
 Eevee, a Pokémon
 Eevee (band), a Philippine band formed in 2004